Senna obliqua is a species of flowering plants in the legume family Fabaceae, and the subfamily Caesalpinioideae. It is found in Peru.

References

External links 

 Cassia obliqua at Tropicos
 Senna obliqua at Tropicos

obliqua
Flora of Peru